Enrico Sgrulletti (born 24 April 1965 in Rome) is a retired male hammer thrower from Italy, whose personal best throw is 81.64 metres, achieved in March 1997 in Ostia.

Biography
He won two medals, at senior level, at the International athletics competitions.

Achievements

See also
 Italian records in athletics
 Italian all-time top lists - Hammer throw

References

External links
 

1965 births
Living people
Italian male hammer throwers
Athletes (track and field) at the 1992 Summer Olympics
Athletes (track and field) at the 1996 Summer Olympics
Olympic athletes of Italy
Athletes from Rome
Mediterranean Games silver medalists for Italy
Mediterranean Games bronze medalists for Italy
Athletes (track and field) at the 1991 Mediterranean Games
Athletes (track and field) at the 1997 Mediterranean Games
World Athletics Championships athletes for Italy
Mediterranean Games medalists in athletics